The 2016 Portland State Vikings football team represented Portland State University during the 2016 NCAA Division I FCS football season. They were led by second-year head coach Bruce Barnum and played their home games at Providence Park. They were a member of the Big Sky Conference. They finished the season 3–8, 2–6 in Big Sky play to finish in a four way tie for ninth place.

Schedule

Game summaries

Central Washington

at San Jose State

at Washington

at Southern Utah

This matchup quickly became known for the controversial comments made by Coach Barnum leading up to the game when he said, referring to Cedar City, Utah (home of SUU), "I didn’t want to stay in Whoville. We are going to stay up in the Grinch's Castle. We are going to go down, play them Saturday, whoop up on them."  SUU fans responded by setting a single-game attendance record, with many students carrying signs mocking Barnum's remarks.

Idaho State

at Weber State

Cal Poly

Northern Colorado

at UC Davis

at Sacramento State

Eastern Washington–The Dam Cup

Ranking movements

References

Portland State
Portland State Vikings football seasons
Portland State Vikings football
Portland State Vikings football